The Potopin is a left tributary of the river Teslui in Romania. It flows into the Teslui in Reșcuța.

References

Rivers of Romania
Rivers of Olt County